Bob Hudson is a former running back in the National Football League.

Biography
Hudson was born Robert Dale Hudson on March 21, 1948, in Hominy, Oklahoma. He played at the collegiate level at Northeastern State University. At Northeastern State, he set school records for rushing yardage, longest touchdown run (99 yards), highest rushing yards average per season and most carries in a season.

Career
Hudson was drafted by the Green Bay Packers in the sixth round of the 1972 NFL Draft and played that season with the team. The following two seasons he played with the Oakland Raiders. During his time with Oakland, Hudson was nicknamed "Headhunter" for his exceptional hits and tackles on the Raiders' special teams. In 1975, his knee was injured in a preseason game against the Atlanta Falcons, and the injury wound up ending his football career.

Post-Career
Hudson had difficulty adjusting to his post-NFL life. In a 1990 interview, Hudson said, "The transition a lot of professional athletes go through takes a long time. In my case, it took almost five years. "When you're playing football, it's an artificial high. All you know is sports. When that's taken away, you try to find something to replace it. I tried alcohol and drugs." He was involved in an automobile crash in 1976, during which he was driving 85 miles an hour while drunk. In the wake of the wreck, he decided to return to Oklahoma and turn his life around.

Hudson went on to earn his college degree in Physical Education in 1983, and worked as a substitute teacher in Bartlesville, Oklahoma. in 1988, he took a position as the Physical Education Director of the Bartlesville Boys Club. He has used that position to spread an anti-drug abuse message, and has also spoken out against drugs at area churches and schools.

In 1988, Hudson was named to the Northeastern Athletics Hall of Fame.

See also
List of Green Bay Packers players

References

1948 births
Living people
American football running backs
Green Bay Packers players
Oakland Raiders players
Northeastern State RiverHawks football players
People from Hominy, Oklahoma